Al-Jamia Al-Islamia Darul Uloom Waqf Deoband  (known as Darul Uloom Waqf) is an Islamic seminary situated in the Indian town of Deoband. It was established by scholars led by Muhammad Salim Qasmi and Anzar Shah Kashmiri in 1982 as a result of administration disputes in Darul Uloom Deoband during 1980–1982. As of 2021, Muhammad Sufyan Qasmi is its rector.

History
During 1980 and 1982, Darul Uloom Deoband experienced administrative disputes, which Muhammad Taqi Usmani regarded as the worst of their type. These disputes led to its bifurcation. Darul Uloom Deoband remained under the control of Madanis, led by Asad Madni, while the other faction which was led by Muhammad Salim Qasmi and Anzar Shah Kashmiri established a new madrassa called Darul Uloom Waqf in 1982. Muhammad Salim Qasmi was its first rector. On September 3, 2014, the advisory board of Darul Uloom Waqf appointed Muhammad Sufyan Qasmi as its rector.

The seminary publishes, Nida'e Darul Uloom Waqf, a monthly magazine in Urdu and Wahdat al-Ummah, a bi-annual Arabic journal. It has publishes a quarterly magazine in English, called, Voice of Darul Uloom. It has a research department called Hujjatul Islam Academy. The academy was established in order to answer modern challenges and simplify the ideology and discourses of Muhammad Qasim Nanautavi. Hayyat-i-Tayyib, the biography of Muhammad Tayyib Qasmi was among its early publications, which was authored by Ghulam Nabi Kashmiri.

Alumni
 Ghulam Nabi Kashmiri

See also
Jamia Imam Muhammad Anwar Shah, Deoband

References

Bibliography

Further reading
 

Deobandi Islamic universities and colleges
Islamic education in India
Madrasas in India
Educational institutions established in 1982
Islamic universities and colleges in India
Deoband
1982 establishments in Uttar Pradesh